Shin Joon-Sup (born June 17, 1963 in Namwon, Jeollabuk-do, South Korea) is a former South Korean middleweight amateur boxer and Olympic Gold Medalist.

Career

Shin began boxing at the age of 16 in 1980 and became a member of the South Korea national boxing team in 1983 to participate in the King's Cup Boxing where he won silver in middleweight.

Shin won the gold medal for South Korea in the middleweight division at the 1983 Boxing World Cup in Rome, Italy. In the quarterfinal bout, he beat 1976 Olympic silver medalist Pedro Gamarro by unanimous decision.

Next year, Shin won the Olympic gold medal at the 1984 Summer Olympics, beating 1984 National Golden Gloves champion Virgil Hill in the final.

After the Olympics, Shin announced his retirement from boxing in order to focus on his studies. However, he returned to the ring in 1985 to win an Asian Games gold medal next year.

At the 1986 Asian Games, Shin easily won the middleweight gold medal, dominating all the opponents in the tourney. He didn't turn professional, and permanently retired from competitive boxing after the Asian Games.

Post career

Shin earned a master's degree in physical education from Wonkwang University. In 1992, he was named an assistant coach of the South Korea national boxing team for the 1992 Summer Olympics. Shin served as a part-time professor at the college before immigrating to the United States in 1996.

Since 2018, he has been serving as a head coach of the boxing organization in Namwon.

Results

References

External links
 
 

1963 births
Living people
Middleweight boxers
Boxers at the 1984 Summer Olympics
Olympic boxers of South Korea
Olympic gold medalists for South Korea
Olympic medalists in boxing
Asian Games medalists in boxing
Boxers at the 1986 Asian Games
South Korean male boxers
Medalists at the 1984 Summer Olympics
Asian Games gold medalists for South Korea
Medalists at the 1986 Asian Games
People from Namwon
Sportspeople from North Jeolla Province